The Renault 2,500 kg (or 2T5) and  the Renault Galion were truck/vans with a 2.5-tonne carrying capacity manufactured by Renault between 1947 and 1957 and then by its subsidiary Saviem between 1957 and 1965.

History

In 1947, Renault launched the Renault 2,500 kg light truck to replace the AHx series. The new vehicle was produced at Renault's main plant in Boulougne-Billancourt.  In 1957, the company moved the production of some of its small commercial vehicle range to Saviem's Blainville-sur-Orne plant, which was built on the former site of the Cahen shipyards. They were the Goélette (loading capacity of up to 1.4 tonnes) and the Renault 2 T 5, renamed Galion (keeping loading capacity of up to 2.5 tonnes). The new models continued been marketed as Renault. The Galion and Goélette names were officially introduced in 1959, prior to that they were still sold with the previous 1T4 and 2T5 denominations.

In 1965, following various revisions to the Galion design, Saviem introduced the more modern and powerful Saviem Super Galion range, and the Galion was discontinued.

Technical details
By 1961, Saviem was producing between 50 and 60 Galions per day. The truck had a rear-wheel drive transmission through a universal joint, coupled to a 4-speed manual gearbox. The Galion mounted various petrol engines. Other Galion versions used the 2.1-litre 671-2 Étendard. At the 1962 Paris Motor Show, Renault announced a new diesel engine for the Galion, replacing the Perkins unit.

The truck had a single-disc manually-operated clutch.  The suspension was made of leaf springs on both axles, with hydraulic dampers. The steering was a recirculating ball type.

Variants and dimensions

Codenames
The petrol versions of both the previous Renault 2T5 and the Renault Galion were codenamed R2160, R2161, R2162, R2163, R2164, R2165, R2166, R2167, R2168 and R2169; the diesel R4166, R4168, R4240, R4242, R4243, R4244, R4245, R4246 and R4247.

References

Saviem
Galion
Vehicles introduced in 1947
Cab over vehicles